Harold Lewis Nash (March 5, 1892 – January 18, 1975) was a one term Republican mayor of Norwalk, Connecticut and engineer.

Biography
He was born on March 5, 1892, to Lewis H. Nash, founder of Nash Engineering Company and member of the Connecticut House of Representatives. He died on January 18, 1975.

References

1892 births
1975 deaths
20th-century American engineers
Connecticut Republicans
Mayors of Norwalk, Connecticut
Stevens Institute of Technology alumni
Engineers from Connecticut
20th-century American politicians